The Minister of Agriculture, Nature and Food Quality is the head of the Ministry of Agriculture, Nature and Food Quality and a member of the Cabinet and the Council of Ministers. The current Minister is Henk Staghouwer of the Christian Union (CU) party who has been in office since 10 January 2022. Regularly a State Secretary is assigned to the Ministry who is tasked with specific portfolios, but not in the current cabinet. In the current cabinet there is also a Minister without Portfolio assigned to the Ministry who is also giving specific portfolios. The current Minister without Portfolio is Christianne van der Wal of the People's Party for Freedom and Democracy (VVD) who also has been in office since 10 January 2022 and has been assigned the portfolios of Nature Conservation and Nitrogen Policy.

List of Ministers of Agriculture (1906–1940)

List of Ministers of Agriculture and Fisheries (since 1940)

List of Ministers without Portfolio

List of State Secretaries for Agriculture

See also
 Ministry of Agriculture, Nature and Food Quality
 Flower bulb cultivation in the Netherlands
 1963 Dutch farmers' revolt
 1971 Dutch farmers' revolt
 1989–1990 Dutch farmers' protests
 Dutch farmers' protests
 Netherlands Food and Consumer Product Safety Authority

References

Agriculture